Erlebert (b. after 600), Seigneur of Quernes, son of Charibert de Haspengau and his wife Wulfgurd.  The only facts known about Erlebert are that he was from a noble family that included his more famous brother Robert I, Bishop of Tours.

The name of Erlebert’s wife is unknown, and they had at least one child:
 Lambert, Abbot of Fontenelle and Bishop of Lyon
Erlebert was part of the family of Robertians.

Sources 

 Settipani, Christian, Les Ancêtres de Charlemagne, 2e édition revue et corrigée, éd. P & G, Prosopographia et Genealogica, 2015,

 Settipani, Christian. ''Addenda aux Ancêtres de Charlemagne'', 1990

 Europäische Stammtafeln (available on-line)

 Jean Baptiste François Hennebert, chanoine de la cathédrale de Saint-Omer, Histoire générale de la province d'Artois dédié à Mgr comte d'Artois, t.  I, Librairie Veuve Henri, Lille, 1786.

 Medieval Lands Project, Erlebert

7th-century Frankish nobility
Robertians